Stalbe is a village in and Stalbe Parish, Cēsis Municipality in the Vidzeme region of Latvia.

Towns and villages in Latvia
Cēsis Municipality
Vidzeme